This is a list of proposed spacecraft that are planned to focus on the exploration of the Solar System, ordered by date of spacecraft launch.

Planned or scheduled

Long-term proposals

See also 
Timeline of Solar System exploration
List of proposed space observatories

References

Solar System Exploration
Discovery and exploration of the Solar System
Solar System spacecraft